Openadaptor is a lightweight open source Enterprise Application Integration (EAI) software toolkit. It provides a configurable component framework for connecting various disparate systems and middleware implementations, with little or no custom programming. 

Developed by Dresdner Kleinwort to integrate its applications with Message-oriented middleware (MOM), whilst avoiding vendor lock-in in the process, Openadaptor has since been open sourced in the first such initiative in the world by an investment bank.   

The product was completely re-written in early 2007 to eliminate certain inherent design shortfalls and accommodate standards and technologies that have emerged since its inception in 1997. Continuing to be led by Dresdner Kleinwort, the overhauled version is used in its mission-critical production systems to process high volumes of financial data.

Notes

External links 
 Openadaptor project page
 Systems Integration with Openadaptor, Java Developer's Journal

Java enterprise platform
Enterprise application integration
Message-oriented middleware